Joseph Grey (born 4 May 2003) is an English professional footballer who plays as a forward for League Two team Hartlepool United.

He started his youth career at Cramlington Juniors, before moving to Wallsend Boys Club and then on to Hartlepool United. He was part of the Hartlepool United squad that gained promotion to League Two in the 2020–21 season.

Club career

Hartlepool United
Born in Newcastle upon Tyne, Grey signed for Hartlepool's youth team in 2019 and turned professional a year early due to interest from other clubs. On signing for the club Grey stated, “I’m over the moon to finally get this done, Hartlepool have been great to me and I was excited to be around the first team at different times last season and now during pre season. I want to continue working and get more opportunities when the season starts”.
He made his league debut in a 4–0 win over Maidenhead United. Grey got his first senior goal in a 6–0 thrashing of Northern Premier League team Ilkeston Town in the FA Cup fourth qualifying round. Grey's first league goal came in a 2–1 defeat to Eastleigh.

On 8 January 2022, Grey scored the winner in a 2–1 win over Championship team Blackpool as a substitute in the third round of the FA Cup. It was his first goal of the season. On 25 January 2022, Grey scored again as Hartlepool reached the semi-finals of the EFL Trophy after defeating Charlton Athletic on penalties.

On 23 June 2022, Grey signed a new three-year deal with Hartlepool.

Style of play
Grey can play as either a winger or as a striker. In his first season playing in the Football League, Grey predominately played as a winger. He is a quick, skilful player who has been praised for his high work ethic.

Career statistics

Honours
Hartlepool United
National League play-offs: 2021

References

External links

Living people
English footballers
Association football forwards
Footballers from Newcastle upon Tyne
Hartlepool United F.C. players
National League (English football) players
English Football League players
2003 births